The men's 4×100 metre freestyle relay event at the 2000 Summer Olympics took place on 16 September at the Sydney International Aquatic Centre in Sydney, Australia.

For the first time in 36 years, the Australians solidified their triumph in front of a raucous home crowd as they upset the undefeated Americans to capture an Olympic title in the event. Leading by 0.15 seconds at the final relay exchange, Ian Thorpe was passed by U.S. swimmer Gary Hall, Jr. at the 350 metres mark, but eventually recovered and touched the wall first with an anchor of 48.30 to deliver the Aussie foursome of Michael Klim (48.18), Chris Fydler (48.48), and Ashley Callus (48.74) a gold-medal time in 3:13.67. Leading off the race, Klim also established a global standard to shave 0.03 seconds off the record set by his Russian training partner Alexander Popov in 1994.

Prior to the 4 × 100 m freestyle relay, Hall posted on his blog: "My biased opinion says that we will smash them (Australia's 4x100m team) like guitars. Historically the U.S. has always risen to the occasion. But the logic in that remote area of my brain says it won't be so easy for the United States to dominate the waters this time." The Australian team responded to Hall's remarks after the race by playing air guitar on the pool deck. Hall recalled the race, saying, "I don't even know how to play the guitar...I consider it the best relay race I've ever been part of. I doff my cap to the great Ian Thorpe. He had a better finish than I had." Another member of Australia's victorious 4x100 team, Michael Klim, recalled that "Hall was the first swimmer to come over and congratulate us. Even though he dished it out, he was a true sportsman".

Team USA's Hall (48.24), Anthony Ervin (48.89), Neil Walker (48.31), and Jason Lezak (48.42) lost a powerful challenge to the Aussies only for the silver in a new American record of 3:13.86, the second-fastest time in history, finishing 1.25 seconds under their five-year-old world record. Meanwhile, Brazil's team of Fernando Scherer (49.79), Gustavo Borges (48.61), Carlos Jayme (49.88), Edvaldo Silva Filho (49.12) earned their first ever relay medal in 20 years, as they took home the bronze with a time of 3:17.40.

Germany (3;17.77), Italy (3:17.85), Sweden (3:19.60), and France (3:21.00) rounded out the championship field, while the Russians, led by Popov, were disqualified due to an early relay launch from Andrey Kapralov on the lead-off leg.

In the absence of Pieter van den Hoogenband on the morning prelims, the Dutch team posted an excellent time of 3:18.32 to lead the first heat, but was cast out of the final race for an early jumping attempt from Dennis Rijnbeek during the second exchange.

Records
Prior to this competition, the existing world and Olympic records were as follows.

The following new world and Olympic records were set during this competition.

Results

Heats

Final

References

External links
Official Olympic Report

Men's 4 X 100 Metre Freestyle Relay
4 × 100 metre freestyle relay
Men's events at the 2000 Summer Olympics